Joseph O'Neill was an Irish novelist.

O'Neill claimed later in his life that he was born in the Aran Islands, County Galway, Ireland, in 1886, but he was in fact born in the inland Galway town of Tuam, preferring, as a writer, the perceived romance of being born in the Gaelic-speaking islands. He became a school inspector and subsequently Secretary of the Department of Education in the newly formed Irish Free State. He wrote five novels, of which the best-known was Land Under England, a science-fiction account of a totalitarian society ruled by telepathic mind control. The novel combines elements of a "lost race"  narrative (the descendants of a Roman legion live underground under the north of England) with fears of totalitarian control. Land Under England has an anti-fascist
subtext. The novel was cited by Karl Edward Wagner as one of the thirteen best science-fiction horror novels. 
His other SF novel, published in 1936, is the future-war story Day of Wrath.
His other novels include the time travel (or timeslip novel)
Wind From the North, in which the author is transported in a dreamlike fashion to Dublin or Dyflin in the period leading up to the Battle of Clontarf in 1014, and Philip, a biblical epic. Wind from the North was later a standard Irish primary school text in the 1950s, in an edition published by Browne & Nolan.

He died on 6 May 1952.

Personal life 

He was the husband of Mary Devenport O'Neill, poet and friend of W. B. Yeats, who consulted her when writing 'A Vision'. Devenport O'Neill was a noted writer in her own right.

List of works

 Wind From the North (1934) [Jonathan Cape], published in the United States by Simon & Schuster.
 Land under England (1935) Gollancz 
 Day of Wrath (1936) Gollancz
 Philip (1940) Gollancz
 Chosen by the Queen (1947)

References

Further reading
Giffuni, C. "Joseph O'Neill, a Bibliography," The Journal of Irish Literature, Volume XVI Number 2 May 1987.

1886 births
1953 deaths
People from County Galway
Irish science fiction writers
Irish male novelists
20th-century Irish novelists
20th-century Irish male writers